is a former Japanese castle located in Nagoya.

History 
It was originally outside the city of Nagoya in the countryside of the Owari Province. The castle was apparently originally constructed by Lord Oda Nobuhide (1508-1549) in 1534. According to legend his son Oda Nobunaga (1534-1582) had his genpuku (coming of age ceremony at age 13) here. The castle is said to have been about 140 metres by 100 metres, and was surrounded by a double moat. The castle was abandoned in 1548 and fell into ruins.  A stone stelae marks the site of the castle.

On parts of the ground the Higashi Honganji Nagoya Betsuin was constructed in the 18th and 19th century.

Castles in Nagoya
Former castles in Japan
Ruined castles in Japan
Oda clan